Sears Hometown and Outlet Stores Inc. was an American retail company that sold home appliances, lawn and garden equipment, apparel, mattresses, sporting goods, and tools. The company had four subsidiary store formats: Sears Hometown, Sears Outlet, Sears Hardware and Appliance, and Sears Home Appliance Showrooms. Sears Hometown and Outlet Stores is based in Hoffman Estates, Illinois. Sears Hometown and Outlet Stores was founded in April 2012. The company was a spun off from Sears Holdings in 2012. By May 2019, Sears Hometown and Outlet Stores and its independent dealers and independent franchisees operated a total of 639 stores across 49 states as well as in Puerto Rico and Bermuda. On June 3, 2019, it was announced that Transform Holdco would acquire Sears Hometown and Outlet Stores. As per the deal, Sears Hometown needed to divest its Sears Outlet division to gain approval. The company ceased to exist on October 23, 2019, when Franchise Group acquired the Sears Outlet division and Transform Holdco acquired the rest of the company.

The company's former subsidiary, Sears Hometown remained in business as an American retail brand of hardware and appliance stores and a Transform Holdco subsidiary with most stores being locally owned and operated franchises.

History
Sears Holdings spun off Sears Hometown and Outlet Stores in 2012 to attempt to restore profitability and raise shareholder confidence. Sears Holdings spun off more than 1,100 Hometown and 122 outlet stores. Hometown stores are small hardware and appliance stores operated by independent retailers. Outlet stores sell Sears merchandise at discount. Outlet stores are approximately 18,000 square feet and equipped with items such as home appliances, lawn and garden equipment, apparel, mattresses, sporting goods and tools. Outlet stores sell discontinued, used, cosmetically blemished or reconditioned merchandise with new parts.

Sears Hometown and Outlet Stores partnered with the National Volunteer Fire Council in November 2013 to raise money for local fire departments. The objective of the campaign was to provide firehouses with funds to improve resources for training, equipment, and financial support.

When former parent Sears Holdings filed for Chapter 11 bankruptcy protection on October 15, 2018, Sears Hometown and Outlet Stores was not affected due to having been spun off from Sears since 2012.

In April 2019, it was announced that Transform Holdco would acquire the company as a result of its subsidiary Sears opening up 3 Sears Home & Life stores by May 2019.

However it was reported a few days later that Sears Hometown and Outlet Stores acquisition offer was rejected, as a result, Sears Hometown and Outlet Stores might face liquidation, having a similar fate to Sears Holdings but which got acquired by ESL Investments a few months ago, but its biggest shareholder Eddie Lampert is trying to save the company from liquidation and hopefully continue the acquisition process.

In June 2019, it was finally announced that Transform Holdco will acquire the remaining shares in the company. As per deal, Sears Hometown and Outlet Stores might need to divest its Sears Outlet division to gain approval. At the time announcement, Sears Hometown and Outlet Stores had 491 Hometown stores and 126 Outlet stores in 49 states, Puerto Rico and Bermuda.

In August 2019, Franchise Group, the parent of Liberty Tax, announced plans to acquire Sears Outlet division from Sears Hometown and Outlet Stores to help fulfill Transform Holdco's requirement in Transform Holdco's acquisition of Sears Hometown and Outlet Stores.

On October 23, 2019, Sears Hometown and Outlet Stores completed its sale of Sears Outlet and Buddy's Home Furnishing businesses to Franchise Group. Transform Holdco completed the acquisition of the remainder of Sears Hometown at the end of the same business day. Stores that were acquired by Franchise Group were re-branded into American Freight stores.

On December 13, 2022, Sears Hometown filed for Chapter 11 bankruptcy. It was later revealed that all remaining Sears Hometown stores would be liquidated and permanently closed.

Finances

Subsidiaries

Sears Hometown Stores

Sears Hometown stores were independently owned stores that sell Sears merchandise. In 2013, 70–80% of Hometown stores were independently owned.
Formerly Sears Dealer Stores, they are a chain of smaller stores that operate as a store where the proprietor owns or leases the real estate while Sears Hometown and Outlet Stores handles the marketing and owns the inventory, and there are no franchising fees levied against the store proprietor. These stores are usually located in smaller markets that do not support full-sized Sears. They are signed as Sears and are usually free-standing or located in strip malls. They primarily concentrate on hardware, appliances and lawn-and-garden supplies. Most of Hometown Stores carry Sears brand products, such as Kenmore, Craftsman, and DieHard, as well as a wide assortment of other national brands. Primarily independently owned and averaging 8,500 square feet, Hometown Stores are designed to serve customers within their local communities. By August 2019, there were 393 Hometown Stores in operation just prior to their sale to Transform Holdco. In May 2022, it was announced that roughly 100 more Sears Hometown stores would close permanently, This came shortly after the company announced plans to close 70 Hometown stores. By September 2022 the number of remaining stores was less than 150.  On December 13, 2022, Sears Hometown filed for Chapter 11 bankruptcy. It was later revealed that all remaining Sears Hometown stores would be liquidated and permanently closed.

Sears Outlet Store

An outlet version of Sears department stores located in various retail locations across the U.S., as well as online. The stores sell appliances, apparel, mattresses, sporting goods, tools, and lawn and garden equipment. Sears Outlet provides in-store and online access to new, one-of-a-kind, out-of-carton, discontinued, obsolete, used, reconditioned, overstocked, and scratch-and-dented merchandise at a discounted price (at twenty to sixty percent off regular retail price)  Each store, on average, is larger than 18,000 square feet in size.

In 1968, Sears opened a surplus store in Kansas City. In 1994, the surplus stores were renamed to Sears Outlet. In 1995, Sears Outlet restructured in order to manage repairs and product distribution from a centralized location. To do this, they established a series of facilities known as Outlet Repair and Distribution Centers. In 2015, there were 22 of these centers in operation. In 2008, apparel was introduced to Sears Outlet stores and served as a liquidation outlet for Lands' End. In 2009, SearsOutlet.com was launched as an e-commerce platform allowing customers to purchase items online and in 2011, nationwide delivery was offered.

In 2012, Sears Hometown and Outlet Stores was spun off from Sears Holdings.
At the time of the separation, there were 122 Sears Outlet Stores in operation. By February 2014, Sears Outlet stores had expanded its operations to 143 locations. The majority of Sears Outlet stores are company-operated (115) and 28 Sears Outlet stores are locally owned and operated by franchisees. Sears Hometown and Outlet Stores initiated a program to franchise Sears Outlet stores in 2012. In 2013, home appliances made up 78% of Sears Outlet's sales revenue and total revenue from Sears Outlet stores was $610 million. In 2014, Sears Outlet partnered with the Make-A-Wish Foundation to support children with life-threatening conditions. By August 2019, 127 Outlet Stores were in operation. In 2019, it was reported that this division might need to be divested as per acquisition by Transform Holdco. And which in August 2019, the company agreed to sell this division to the Franchise Group, the parent company of Liberty Tax. The sale of the division to the Franchise Group was finalized on October 23, 2019.

Two months later, the Franchise Group acquired American Freight in December 2019 and later rebranded its Sears Outlet stores as American Freight by April 2020.

Sears Home Appliance Showroom
Home appliance showrooms display merchandise in-stores. The stores have an internet kiosk where customers are able to view similar products, price match, and order products not available in the store. Averaging 5,000 square feet with a primarily appliance showroom design   As of October 2019, there are currently 15 locations in operation.

Sears Appliance and Hardware Store
Sears appliance and hardware stores were hardware stores that carry the entire line of Sears hardware and appliances. averaging nearly 28,000 square feet in size, are primarily located in suburban markets. All locations were closed by June 2019.

Awards
Sears Hometown and Outlet Stores received the Customer Engagement award from the online publication Retail TouchPoints for their interactive in-store campaign.

References

External links

 
 Sears Hometown Stores
 Sears Outlet
 Sears Home Appliance Showroom
 Sears Hardware Stores

Retail companies established in 2012
Retail companies disestablished in 2019
American companies established in 2012
Companies that filed for Chapter 11 bankruptcy in 2022
2012 establishments in Illinois
2019 disestablishments in Illinois
Companies based in Cook County, Illinois
Hoffman Estates, Illinois
Retail companies of the United States
Corporate spin-offs
2019 mergers and acquisitions